Nicholas Boone Symmonds (born December 30, 1983) is an American YouTube personality and retired middle-distance track athlete, from Boise, Idaho, who specialized in the 800 meters and 1500 meters distances. Symmonds signed with Brooks Running in January 2014 after a 7-year sponsorship with Nike. In college at Willamette University he won seven NCAA Division III titles in outdoor track. Symmonds is a 6-time US National 800 meters champion. He has competed in the 800m at two Olympic Games, reaching the semi-finals in Beijing 2008; in London 2012, he finished fifth in the final, running a personal best of 1:42.95 behind David Rudisha's world record. He won a silver medal in the 800 meters at the 2013 World Championships, having previously finished sixth in the 2009 final and fifth in 2011.

Symmonds is also the co-founder and former CEO of a supplement company called Run Gum, which makes functional chewing gum used by athletes, students, professionals, etc.  He launched Run Gum with his coach Sam Lapray in October 2014 with their flagship product, Energy Gum.

Following his retirement, Symmonds gained more popularity in 2020 through his YouTube channel which primarily focuses on running, powerlifting, and fitness.

Early life and education
Symmonds was born on December 30, 1983, in Blytheville, Arkansas. His family moved to Boise, Idaho when he was three-years old. His father Jeffrey Symmonds is a surgeon, and his mother Andrea is a teacher. Raised in Boise, Nick is a 2002 graduate of Bishop Kelly High School in that city. An avid outdoorsman, Nick earned his Eagle Scout award in high school. In high school, he won state championships in the 800 meters (PR 1:53), 1600 meters (PR 4:20) and 3200 meters (PR 9:47)  individual races and on the 4 × 400 m relay. He chose Willamette University in Salem, Oregon over other schools that could offer athletic scholarships. At Willamette, an NCAA Division III school, Symmonds earned a degree in biochemistry in 2006 and is a member of the Sigma Chi fraternity.

Running career

Collegiate
While at Willamette, he won the 800 m NCAA championship race all four years and 1500 m NCAA championship race as a freshman, junior, and senior. Symmonds collegiate best in the 800m (1:45.83) currently ranks No. 1 in NCAA Division III history. His 1500m collegiate best (3:40.91) ranks No. 3 all-time in NCAA Division III. Though Symmonds is widely regarded as Willamette's most decorated athlete, his poor relationship with Head Coach Matt McGuirk has prevented wide celebration of his athletic achievements at his alma mater.

Post-collegiate

After college, Symmonds joined the Oregon Track Club Elite. A seven-time outdoor track champion at the NCAA III level, he was runner-up at the AT&T USA Outdoor Track and Field Championships in 2006 in the 800m race. In 2007, he won the 800m race at the Prefontaine Classic meet in Eugene, Oregon, with a then personal best time of 1:44.54, shocking the current Olympic champion Yuriy Borzakovskiy by beating him with his own come-from-behind strategy. See the video.

In 2008, Symmonds won the United States Olympic Trials 800m final held in Eugene, Oregon with a personal best time of 1:44.10. He was the first of three Oregon associated athletes to finish at the top of this race before the home crowd, the other two being Andrew Wheating from the University of Oregon and Oregon Track Club training partner Christian Smith, an event referred to as the "Oregon sweep" and replayed many times in television coverage of the meet. This qualified all three men for the U.S. Olympic Team for the 2008 Summer Olympics in Beijing, China, for the 800 m race. At the Beijing Olympics, Symmonds won his first-round heat, then finished a non-qualifying fifth place in his semifinal heat with a time of 1:46.96, 0.73 seconds behind the winner of that heat.

Symmonds continued to improve in 2009, winning the USATF Championships over Khadevis Robinson, which qualified him to represent the United States at the World Championships. As part of his preparation for the championships, Symmonds ran a personal best of 1:43.83 on July 29, 2009, in Monaco. A few weeks later, Symmonds became the first American to qualify for the final of the men's 800m since 1997. He finished sixth in 1:45.71. In 2010, he lowered his personal record again, to 1:43.76, while finishing third behind David Rudisha's 1:41.01 world record at the IAAF World Challenge track and field meet in Rieti, Italy.

On June 25, 2012, Symmonds returned to the 2012 United States Olympic Trials again on his home track in Eugene, Oregon. The race went out fast, with Charles Jock leading Duane Solomon through a sub-50 second first lap. Atypically, Symmonds was not far off that pace. As Jock faded, Solomon charged off to a big lead through the final turn. Symmonds ran around the field and sprinted past Solomon on the homestretch to make his second Olympic team.

At the London Olympics, Symmonds was one of the two time qualifiers for the final of the 800m. He placed fifth in the final with a new personal best of 1:42.95; David Rudisha placed first in the world record time of 1:40.91., with Nijel Amos of Botswana second, Timothy Kitum of Kenya third, and Symmonds' teammate Duane Solomon fourth.

In 2013, Symmonds achieved his highest placing at an international championship, winning a silver medal at the 2013 IAAF World Championships in Athletics by running a season's best of 1:43.55, 2nd only to Ethiopia's Mohammed Aman.  At the time, this was the highest an American had ever finished in the men's 800 meters at the World Championships.

Symmonds was removed from the U.S. team at the 2015 World Championships in Athletics due to a sponsorship rights conflict between personal sponsor Brooks and U.S. sponsor Nike.

Symmonds had to forego racing the 2016 Olympic Trials due to an injured ankle. He retired after being eliminated in the heats of the 2017 US Championships.

Run Gum
In 2014, Nick and his former coach, Sam Lapray, founded Run Gum, which markets a caffeinated chewing gum to athletes. In January 2016 Run Gum filed an antitrust lawsuit against USA Track and Field for rules that Symmonds feels suppress competition. In May, a federal judge dismissed the suit.

Symmonds often advertises Run Gum on his YouTube channel, through giving away Run Gum products as challenge prizes. There has also been several Run Gum social media accounts created, the most prominent of which is a TikTok account with over 750 thousand followers and 38 million likes.

YouTube career
Symmonds' YouTube channel broke out in late 2019, and currently has over 1 million subscribers and 185 million views. In his YouTube videos, he often refers to himself as "The Bison". His content focuses on challenges involving fitness and running. He is good friends with fellow YouTuber A.J. Lapray. Sometime in 2020 he signed a deal with Gymshark. 
In June and July 2020, Symmonds became a topic of controversy in the running community when he organized events ignoring social distancing guidance for his videos.
In March 2020, one of Symmonds' YouTube videos led to the suspension of three NCAA college athletes from his alma mater, Willamette University, when he gifted them Run Gum prizes for participating in his video.

Beginning in 2020, Symmonds has started a second YouTube channel named 'Nick Symmonds Too', consisting of many reaction, tutorial and challenge videos of shorter length. As of 2023, the channel has 50.7 thousand subscribers, and 5.2 million views.

Personal life

In 2020, Symmonds married Tiana Baur.

Symmonds has a pet rabbit named Mortimer, with whom he posed for a PETA ad campaign against animal testing.

Symmonds is also an avid fisherman.

In 2017, Symmonds was hired by the newly formed Track Town Summer Series Professional Track & Field league to act as General Manager for the team representing San Francisco.
Symmonds opposes what he considers absurdly strict rules restricting athletes' ability to market themselves. For the 2012 season, he auctioned off space on his left shoulder for a temporary tattoo to advertise a sponsor. The winning bidder was a Milwaukee advertising agency, Hanson Dodge Creative, which paid $11,000 for the space to advertise their Twitter handle. During restricted competitions like the Olympic trials and the Olympics themselves, Symmonds is required to cover up the tattoo with white tape, which actually draws attention to the tattoo advertising underneath. Symmonds is not the first track athlete to do this; 2004 Olympic champion shot-putter Adam Nelson actively sold space on his shirt during the 2005 season (when he won the IAAF World Championships). The practice is also common in boxing.

At the 2013 World Championships in Athletics in Moscow, Symmonds was a vocal critic of Russia's "anti-gay" laws. He dedicated his silver medal to his gay and lesbian friends.

Symmonds published an article in the November 2013 issue of Runner's World magazine advocating that Congress should "[b]an assault rifles and handguns for everyone except police and military personnel."

Personal records
 100m outdoors (Masters 35+) - 11.52 (Eugene, Oregon, July 25, 2019)
200m outdoors (Masters 35+) - 24.39 (Eugene, Oregon, March 5, 2020)
400 m outdoors - 47.45 (Dublin, Ireland, July 25, 2012)
 800 m outdoors - 1:42.95 (London, August 9, 2012)
 800 m indoors - 1:46.48 (Valencia, Spain, March 9, 2008)
 1500 m - 3:34.55 (Monaco 2013)
 Mile indoors - 3:56.72 (Seattle, Washington, January 13, 2007)
 Mile outdoors - 3:51 (2013)
 Mile outdoors (road) - 3:54.9 (Oregon, January 31, 2020)
 Beer mile - 5:19 (August 21, 2012)
 5k road - 15:49 (Boise Idaho, November 27, 2014)
 Marathon - 3:00:35 (Honolulu, Hawaii)

Major victories
 USA Outdoor Track and Field Championships: 2008 (1:44.10); 2009 (1:45.86); 2010 (1:45.98); 2011 (1:44.17); 2012 (1:43.92); 2015 (1:44.53)
 2012 USA Olympic Trials 800 m - 1:43.92 (June 25, 2012)
 2009 Prefontaine Classic 800 m - 1:45.86 (June 7, 2009)
 2009 Boston Indoor Games 1000 m - 2:20.52 (February 7, 2009)
 2008 USA Olympic Trials 800 m - 1:44.10 (June 30, 2008)
 2007 Prefontaine Classic 800 m - 1:44.54 (June 10, 2007)
 2007 USA Indoors 800 m - 1:48.73
 2007 Boston Indoor Games 800 m - 1:48.15

See also
Middle distance track event

References

External links

Nick Symmonds' Official Blog
Wind-aided? No, these performances were decibel-aided, ESPN.com
Little-known Symmonds gives the U.S. big hopes in 800 meters, ESPN The Magazine

1983 births
Living people
Willamette University alumni
American male middle-distance runners
Sportspeople from Boise, Idaho
Athletes (track and field) at the 2008 Summer Olympics
Athletes (track and field) at the 2012 Summer Olympics
Olympic track and field athletes of the United States
Track and field athletes from Oregon
American LGBT rights activists
USA Outdoor Track and Field Championships winners
USA Indoor Track and Field Championships winners